Gastrellarius is a genus of beetles in the family Carabidae, containing the following species:

 Gastrellarius blanchardi (G.horn, 1891)
 Gastrellarius honestus (Say, 1823)
 Gastrellarius unicarum (Darlington, 1931)

References

Pterostichinae